Night Terror or Night Terrors may refer to:

Arts and entertainment
 Night Terror (Soulcalibur), a fictional character in the fighting game Soulcalibur III
 Night Terrors (novel), a Buffy novel by Alice Henderson
 "Night Terror", a song by English singer Laura Marling
 "Night Terrors", a song by Static-X on Start a War

Film and television
 Night Terrors (film), a 1993 horror film directed by Tobe Hooper
 "Night Terrors" (Star Trek: The Next Generation), a fourth season episode from Star Trek: The Next Generation
 "Night Terrors" (Doctor Who), an episode from the sixth series of Doctor Who

Other uses
 Night terror, a medical condition

See also
 Terror by Night, a 1946 Sherlock Holmes crime drama